Yibin Caiba Airport is a military and former public airport in the city of Yibin in southern Sichuan province of China. Located in the town of Caiba in Cuiping District, the airport was opened on 16 December 1992.

In 2011 Yibin Caiba Airport served 326,000 passengers, a 12.4% increase over the previous year, and 2,737.6 tons of cargo. As the airport's location limited its capability to expand, in May 2012 the State Council of China approved the building of the new Yibin Wuliangye Airport to replace Caiba Airport.

Caiba Airport served its last civil flight in the evening of 4 December 2019, and all commercial operations were then transferred to Wuliangye Airport, which opened the following day. As the military facilities of the new airport are still under construction, Caiba is expected to continue serving as a military airbase for approximately another year, and will then be completely closed.

See also
List of airports in China
List of the busiest airports in China
List of People's Liberation Army Air Force airbases

References

Airports in Sichuan
Chinese Air Force bases
Buildings and structures in Yibin
Defunct airports in China
Airports established in 1992
1992 establishments in China
Airports disestablished in 2019
2019 disestablishments in China